Richie Gaskell (born c. 1933) is a former American football player and coach. He played college football at George Washington University in Washington, D.C. from 1951 to 1954. Gaskell was drafted by the San Francisco 49ers in the 1955 NFL Draft. He served as the head football coach at Carson–Newman University from 1966 to 1969, compiling a record of 27–12–2.

References

Year of birth missing (living people)
1930s births
Living people
American football ends
American football halfbacks
Carson–Newman Eagles football coaches
Furman Paladins football coaches
George Washington Colonials football players